Fongshan is a station on the Orange line of the Kaohsiung MRT in Fongshan District, Kaohsiung, Taiwan. Located in the historical centre of Fongshan. The MRT station's location is about 700 meters from the Taiwan Railway Administration Fengshan Station.

Station overview
The station is a two-level, underground station with an island platform and two exits. The station is 190 metres long and is located at the intersection of Fongshan Zihyou Rd., Jhongshan West Rd. and Jhongshan Rd.

Station layout

Exits
Exit 1: Fongshan Elementary School, Chenglan Fort
Exit 2: Caogong Elementary School, Fongyi Tutorial Academy, Zhonghua Street Night Market

Around the station
 Fengshan Stadium
 Fengshan railway station (about 700 meters or 2300 feet to the northeast)
 Fengxi Sports Park
 Fongyi Tutorial Academy
 Zhonghua Street Night Market
 Caogong Temple
 Fengyi Kaizhang Sacred King Temple (鳳邑開漳聖王廟)
 Chenglan Fort
 Pingcheng Fort
 Caogong Elementary School
 Fongshan Elementary School
 Fongsi Junior High School
 Fongshan Flying Square

References

2008 establishments in Taiwan
Kaohsiung Metro Orange line stations
Railway stations opened in 2008